The 1985 Austrian Open  (also known as the 1985 Head Cup for sponsorship reasons) was a men's tennis tournament played on outdoor clay courts. It was part of the 1985 Nabisco Grand Prix. It took place at the Tennis stadium Kitzbühel in Kitzbühel, Austria, from 5 August through 11 August 1985. Pavel Složil won the singles title.

Finals

Singles
 Pavel Složil defeated  Michael Westphal, 7–5, 6–2
 It was Složil's only singles title of the year and the 2nd and last of his career.

Doubles
 Sergio Casal /  Emilio Sánchez defeated  Paolo Canè /  Claudio Panatta, 6–4, 7–6

References

Austrian Open
Austrian Open Kitzbühel
Austrian Open
Vienna Open